John Timon, C.M. (February 12, 1797 – April 16, 1867) was a prelate of the Roman Catholic Church.  He served as the bishop of the new Diocese of Buffalo in Western New York and founder of the brothers of the Holy Infancy religious order.

Biography

Early life 
John Timon was born in Conewago, Pennsylvania on February 12, 1797, to James Timon and Margaret Leddy Timon, immigrants from County Cavan in Ireland. In 1803 the family moved to Baltimore, Maryland, where James Timon started a dry goods store.  In 1811, John Timon was enrolled in St. Mary's College in Baltimore.  After graduation he worked in the family dry goods business. In 1818, the family moved to Louisville, Kentucky. They relocated a year later to St. Louis, Missouri. 

A financial panic in 1823 ruined the family finances.  Timon was also shaken by the death of a young woman that he was in love with. As he later said, the panic made him think about what was really important to him and decided to enter the priesthood.  That same year, he entered the St. Mary of the Barrens Seminary in Perrysville, Missouri, where he studied philosophy and theology. One of his professors was the Reverend Jean-Marie Odin, later Bishop of Galveston. Timon himself taught English and the natural sciences. 

In 1824, Timon accompanied Odin on a missionary trip through Texas and then Arkansas. This trip included many nights sleeping on floors, traveling through rough terrain, and patiently dealing with prejudice from some non-Catholics. In dealing with one host who thought Catholics were idolaters, Timon asked her if she worshipped a picture of George Washington on her wall  She said certainly not, that it was a source of inspiration.  Timon then showed the woman a crucifix. He said that he did not worship the crucifix, but instead used it to remind him of the suffering of Christ. That conversation opened a new understanding between them.  Timon professed his vows to the Vincentians order on June 10, 1825.  While in Arkansas, Odin and Timon met with a Quapaw tribe, where the two missionaries asked about their religious beliefs.

Priesthood 
Timon was ordained into the priesthood by Bishop Joseph Rosati on September 23, 1826 for the Vincentian order. After his ordination, Timon served as a professor at the seminary and as a missionary, visiting communities around Cape Giradeau, Missouri, and Jackson, Missouri. In 1828, Timon was called to Jackson to visit a criminal to be hanged the next day.  The man had steadily refused any religious counseling.  Entering the cell, Timon lay down on the prisoner's bed and started talking to him.  By the end of his talk, the prisoner was crying and expressing remorse.  He later requested baptism before his execution. 

In 1835, the Vicentians meeting in Paris appointed Timon as "visitor" (superior) of the new Vicentians province in the United States,  His initial thought was to refuse the position, but was persuaded to take it. The Vincentians wanted Timon to close the seminary as it was in deep debt, but Timon worked to save it. He visited the superior general of the order in Paris in 1837. The next year, Timon spent time in Galveston and Houston, Texas on missionary work. 

In 1839, he was named coadjutor bishop of the Archdiocese of St. Louis but declined the appointment.  Timon was very reluctant to take on a position that would take him away from the missionary work that he enjoyed.  On July 18, 1840, Timon was named the prefect apostolic of the Republic of Texas.  Timon returned to France in 1841, where he met with the superior generals and visited many Vincentian congregations near Paris.  Between 1842 and 1847, Timon received requests from prelates in Cincinnati, Philadelphia, Louisville and New York to visit their seminaries and enact necessary reforms.

Bishop of Buffalo 
On April 23, 1847, Pope Pius IX erected the Diocese of Buffalo and appointed Timon as its first bishop. In September 1847, Timon learned about his appointment. Lacking money for appropriate clothing and transportation to New York, he was helped out by some friends.  Timon was consecrated on October 17, 1847 at St. Patrick's Cathedral in New York City by Archbishop John Hughes.

Timon was fluent in several languages including Gaelic, which served him well among the Irish community in the city.Timon spent the remaining 20 years of his life building the Church there. Beginning with 16 priests for 16 counties, he immediately began to build churches, and establish schools. He appointed Reverend Bernard O'Reilly as his vicar-general.

During his tenure, many religious orders were recruited to establish ministries in the newly formed diocese including the Daughters of Charity, the School Sisters of Notre Dame, the Ladies of the Sacred Heart, the Franciscans, the Sisters of Saint Mary of Namur, the Jesuits, the Oblates of Mary Immaculate, the Sisters of St. Joseph, the Vincentians, the Sisters of the Good Shepherd, the Grey Nuns of the Sacred Heart, the Sisters of Mercy, the Sisters of St. Francis, the Passionists, and the Christian Brothers.

St. Bonaventure University was founded by Utica, New York financier Nicholas Devereux with assistance from Timon. The two invited the Franciscan order to Western New York, and a small group under Father Pamfilo of Magliano OFM arrived in 1856.

Death and legacy
John Timon died in Buffalo on April 16, 1867, at the age of 70. He was buried in the crypt of Saint Joseph's Cathedral in Buffalo. Bishop Timon - St. Jude High School in Buffalo is named in his honor.

References

External links
 Roman Catholic Archdiocese of Galveston–Houston
 Roman Catholic Diocese of Buffalo

1797 births
1867 deaths
Niagara University people
Vincentians
People from Adams County, Pennsylvania
19th-century Roman Catholic bishops in the United States
Roman Catholic bishops of Buffalo
American Roman Catholic clergy of Irish descent
Vincentian bishops
Burials in Buffalo, New York
Catholics from Pennsylvania